Anton Konstantinovich Kozorez (born 14 May 1983) is a former Russian professional footballer.

Club career
He played 6 seasons in the Russian Football National League for FC Amur Blagoveshchensk and FC SKA-Energiya Khabarovsk.

Honours
 Russian Second Division Zone East best goalkeeper: 2004.

References

External links
 

1983 births
Living people
People from Blagoveshchensk
Russian footballers
Association football goalkeepers
FC Dynamo Vologda players
FC Atyrau players
FC SKA-Khabarovsk players
Kazakhstan Premier League players
Russian expatriate footballers
Expatriate footballers in Kazakhstan
Russian expatriate sportspeople in Kazakhstan
FC Amur Blagoveshchensk players
Sportspeople from Amur Oblast